Brooklyn Boulders (BKB) is an adventure lifestyle company that builds and operates urban climbing, fitness, and community centers.

History 
Brooklyn Boulders was founded in 2009 and is currently operated by Lance Pinn, President and Co-Founder, and Jeremy Balboni, Chief Executive Officer. Construction began in March 2009 and on September 9, 2009, the first Brooklyn Boulders location opened in the old Daily News garage on Third Avenue in Gowanus. BKB Gowanus is a 18,000-square-foot (1,700 m2) climbing facility—the first of its kind in New York City.

On July 31, 2013, Brooklyn Boulders opened their second location, Brooklyn Boulders Somerville, "a 40,000-square-foot climbing facility; a hybrid climbing and fitness facility collaborative workspace in Somerville, Massachusetts." Soon after, Brooklyn Boulders opened its first location in the Midwest. They opened Brooklyn Boulders Chicago on December 13, 2014, located in Chicago's West Loop. Brooklyn Boulders Chicago features "a 1,000-square-foot Active Collaborative Workspace", with standing desks, exercise-ball sitting desks, and above-desk pull-up bars." A year later, Brooklyn Boulders opened its fourth facility in Long Island City, known as BKB Queensbridge, with a Grand Opening celebration held on December 10, 2015. It takes up the first floor, basement and sub-basement of a 17 story high rise residential tower and was one of the first of its kind. Bloomberg Business featured Brooklyn Boulders in September 2015, declaring that "Brooklyn Boulders is tapping climbing's popularity in the tech world to become a co-working haven for (very ripped) entrepreneurs."

Brooklyn Boulders Foundation (BKBF) 
Brooklyn Boulders Foundation (BKBF) is a 501(c)(3) public charity founded in 2010. BKBF includes the Adaptive Climbing Group and City Rocks.

Adaptive Climbing Group 
Brooklyn Boulders is home to the Adaptive Climbing Group (ACG), founded by climber and adaptive athlete Kareemah Batts. ACG offers people with permanent disabilities the opportunity to inclusively participate in the sport of climbing and competing. It takes the already existing abilities of a person and helps them engage in the sport.

The Hueco Hacienda 
The Hueco Hacienda is Brooklyn Boulders’ lodging facility located in the Chihuahuan Desert, 15 miles outside of El Paso, Texas, and approximately one mile from Hueco Tanks State Park and Historic Site. The Hacienda provides climbers and guests a place to stay after climbing and hiking at Hueco Tanks. Visitors have access to hiking trails, bouldering, and backcountry tours.

Press 
Brooklyn Boulders is known for graffiti adorning their walls, to which artist Cope2 contributed, and its "biggest architectural flourish: a replica of the Brooklyn Bridge suitable for climbing." Called the "best workout in Brooklyn" by Vogue, Brooklyn Boulders has been visited by some of the world's best climbers, including Ashima Shiraishi and Sasha DiGiulian. During Hurricane Sandy, Brooklyn Boulders was transformed into "an operating base for Team Rubicon, a disaster response organization," and remained open for 24 hours. Brooklyn Boulders Somerville hosted TEDxSomerville on March 30, 2015. In April 2019, travel expert and host Samantha Brown showed New York Live's Lauren Scala "Places to Love" in New York, including Brooklyn Boulders in Gowanus.

References

Companies based in New York City
Entertainment companies of the United States
Climbing and mountaineering equipment companies